Hermilo Leal Lara (born 21 December 1951) is a Mexican fencer. He competed in the team épée and individual sabre events at the 1972 Summer Olympics.

References

External links
 

1951 births
Living people
Mexican male épée fencers
Olympic fencers of Mexico
Fencers at the 1972 Summer Olympics
Mexican male sabre fencers
20th-century Mexican people